Maurice Charles Rees Richards (born 2 February 1945) is a Welsh former dual-code international rugby footballer. A wing, he was part of the 1968 British Lions tour to South Africa. His grandfather had been a professional footballer with Charlton Athletic and Bradford City in the 1920s.

Richards played rugby union at club level for Cardiff, and the Wales national rugby union team before switching to rugby league in 1969 with Salford.

Playing career

International honours
Maurice Richards won caps for Wales (RL) while at Salford 1969...1975 3-caps (World Cup in 1975 1-cap), and won caps for Great Britain (RL) while at Salford in 1974 against Australia, and New Zealand.

County Cup Final appearances
Maurice Richards played , i.e. number 5, and scored a try in Salford's 25–11 victory over Swinton in the 1972 Lancashire County Cup Final during the 1972–73 season at Wilderspool Stadium, Warrington on Saturday 21 October 1972, played  in the 2–6 defeat by Widnes in the 1974 Lancashire County Cup Final during the 1974–753 season at Central Park, Wigan on Saturday 2 November 1974, and played , and scored a try in the 7–16 defeat by Widnes in the 1975 Lancashire County Cup Final during the 1975–76 season at Central Park, Wigan on Saturday 4 October 1975.

BBC2 Floodlit Trophy Final appearances
Maurice Richards played , i.e. number 5, in Salford's 0–0 draw with Warrington in the 1974 BBC2 Floodlit Trophy Final during the 1974–75 season at The Willows, Salford on Tuesday 17 December 1974, and played , and scored a try in the 10–5 victory over Warrington in the 1974 BBC2 Floodlit Trophy Final replay during the 1974–75 season at Wilderspool Stadium, Warrington on Tuesday 28 January 1975.

Player's No.6 Trophy Final appearances
Maurice Richards played , i.e. number 5, in Salford's 7–12 defeat by Leeds in the 1972–73 Player's No.6 Trophy Final during the 1972–73 season at Fartown Ground, Huddersfield on Saturday 24 March 1973.

Career Records
Maurice Richards holds Salford's "Most Career Appearances" record with 498 appearances, as well as being the club's record try scorer and is one of the fewer than twenty Welshmen to have scored more than 200-tries in their rugby league career.

References

External links
!Great Britain Statistics at englandrl.co.uk (statistics currently missing due to not having appeared for both Great Britain, and England)

1945 births
Living people
British & Irish Lions rugby union players from Wales
Cardiff RFC players
Dual-code rugby internationals
Great Britain national rugby league team players
Rugby league players from Rhondda Cynon Taf
Rugby league wingers
Rugby union players from Ystrad
Rugby union wings
Salford Red Devils players
Wales international rugby union players
Wales national rugby league team players
Welsh rugby league players
Welsh rugby union players